Beyond Description (1973–1989) is the second twelve-CD box set retrospective of the Grateful Dead's studio and live albums. A companion to The Golden Road (1965–1973) box set, it covers their time on the Grateful Dead Records and Arista Records labels, from 1973 to 1989.

The set contains expanded and remastered versions of all the albums during the brief period with their own label (except Steal Your Face), and during their time on Arista (except Without a Net and later box set So Many Roads). Included are numerous previously unreleased studio outtakes and live tracks. The ten albums in the set are Wake of the Flood, From the Mars Hotel, Blues for Allah, Terrapin Station, Shakedown Street, Go to Heaven, In the Dark, Built to Last, and the two live albums Reckoning and Dead Set (both expanded to two-CD sets).

Pre-ordered copies included a bonus disc with five live tracks and a studio rehearsal. The albums, with the bonus tracks, were given individual release in 2006. Previous box set Dead Zone, released in 1987, contains six of the same albums.

Track listing 
See individual album pages for more information

Disc One: Wake of the Flood 
 Wake of the Flood

Disc Two: From the Mars Hotel 
 From the Mars Hotel

Disc Three: Blues for Allah 
 Blues for Allah

Disc Four: Terrapin Station 
 Terrapin Station

Disc Five: Shakedown Street 
 Shakedown Street

Disc Six: Go to Heaven 
 Go to Heaven

Disc Seven: Reckoning, disc 1 
 Reckoning Disc 1

 All tracks live at Warfield Theatre, San Francisco, CA (September 25, 1980October 14, 1980) & Radio City Music Hall, New York City, NY (October 22, 1980October 31, 1980)

Disc Eight: Reckoning, disc 2 
 Reckoning Disc 2

Disc Nine: Dead Set, disc 1 
 Dead Set Disc 1

 All tracks live at Warfield Theatre, San Francisco, CA (September 25, 1980October 14, 1980) & Radio City Music Hall, New York City, NY (October 22, 1980October 31, 1980)

Disc Ten: Dead Set, disc 2 
 Dead Set Disc 2

Disc Eleven: In the Dark 
 In the Dark

Disc Twelve: Built to Last 
 Built to Last

Bonus Disc

Notes

Personnel

Grateful Dead 
 Jerry Garcia – guitar, vocals
 Bob Weir – guitar, vocals
 Phil Lesh – electric bass, vocals
 Donna Godchaux – vocals on discs 1-5
 Keith Godchaux – keyboards, piano, vocals on discs 1-5
 Brent Mydland – keyboards, Hammond organ, vocals on discs 6-12
 Mickey Hart – drums, percussion (except for discs 1 & 2)
 Bill Kreutzmann – drums, percussion

Additional performers 
 for a comprehensive listing, see individual album pages

Production 
James Austin, David Lemieux –  producers
Cameron Sears –  executive producer
Jimmy Edwards –  associate producer
Robin Hurley –  associate producer
Hale Milgrim –  associate producer
Scott Pascucci –  associate producer
Eileen Law –  archival research
Joe Gastwirt –  mastering
Tom Flye –  additional mixing
Robert Gatley –  mixing assistant
Reggie Collines –  discography annotation
Hugh Brown –  reissue art direction
Steve Vance –  design, reissue art direction

References

2004 compilation albums
Grateful Dead compilation albums
Rhino Records compilation albums